Steven LoBue (born June 17, 1985) is an American high diver.

He participated at the 2017 and 2019 World Aquatics Championships, winning gold and silver medals respectively. LoBue has also been a top competitor on the Red Bull Cliff Diving World Series for many years.

References

External links
 

1985 births
Living people
Male high divers
American male divers
World Aquatics Championships medalists in high diving